The Albanese government is the federal executive government of Australia, led by Prime Minister Anthony Albanese of the Australian Labor Party. The Albanese Government commenced on 23 May 2022, when Albanese and an interim ministry of four other Labor MPs were sworn into their relevant ministerial portfolios by the Governor-General of Australia. The government is composed of members of the Labor Party which governs with 77 seats on the floor of the House of Representatives, enough for a two-seat majority. Albanese succeeded the Scott Morrison-led Liberal/National Coalition government (2018–2022), which became unable to continue in government following their defeat in the 2022 federal election. This is the first Labor government to be in office at the federal level since the second Rudd government was defeated by the Coalition at the 2013 election. Deputy Labor leader Richard Marles is serving as Deputy Prime Minister of Australia.

Background

2022 federal election 

The 2022 federal election was called by Morrison on 10 April 2022, when he visited the Governor-General advising the latter to prorogue Parliament and dissolve the House of Representatives. The Governor-General accepted Morrison's recommendations, as is the custom in Australia's Westminster system of government. The Parliament was then prorogued and the House of Representatives dissolved the next morning.

The Labor election campaign focused on aged care in Australia, the introduction of a National Anti-Corruption Commission, childcare subsidies, climate change, a similar Defence budget to the Coalition but with a Defence Posture Review into resources and strategy, education, electric vehicles, farming, health, housing, infrastructure, a review of the NDIS, as well as measures to help older Australians.

The election was held on 21 May 2022. As of 10:00PM AEST on election night, the Labor Party (led by Anthony Albanese) was projected to form a government by ABC News, although it was not clear whether they would have a majority or a minority. Notable outcomes included the popularity of community independents in several inner-city seats, costing Treasurer and Deputy Liberal Leader Josh Frydenberg his seat; a particularly sizable swing from the Coalition to Labor in Western Australia; and notably strong support for the Australian Greens in some inner-city Brisbane seats.

After the bulk of the votes had been counted and a Labor victory appeared inevitable, Morrison conceded the election, and then announced his intention to resign as the Liberal Party leader. The Coalition's loss was attributed to Morrison's unpopularity with voters and the popularity of centrist "teal independents" in certain inner-city electorates. Albanese, who also made history as the first Italian-Australian to secure the position of Prime Minister, was sworn in as the new Prime Minister of Australia on 23 May 2022.

Appointments

Interim Ministry 
Although it was not certain on election night that Labor would win a majority, no other party could realistically form a government. Accordingly, two days after the election, Albanese, deputy leader Richard Marles, former shadow treasurer Jim Chalmers, and senators Penny Wong and Katy Gallagher were sworn in as an interim five-person ministry. The five ministers divided all portfolios between them until the full ministry was determined. According to Australia's ABC News, the governor-general David Hurley would not have sworn in Albanese without assurances that Labor could provide stable government, as well as legal advice that this was the proper course of action. Albanese confirmed that he secured confidence and supply from the crossbench in the event that he was not able to form majority government.

Ministry 
Albanese announced the composition of the full Albanese Ministry on 31 May 2022. Given that frontbenchers Kristina Keneally and Terri Butler were not re-elected, Murray Watt and Clare O’Neil were chosen by the Labor caucus to replace them in the cabinet. With 19 female frontbenchers and 10 female cabinet ministers, it will be the most gender equal ministry in Australian history. The full ministry was sworn in by the Governor-General on 1 June 2022.

Public service 
Phil Gaetjens, the Secretary of the Department of Prime Minister and Cabinet under Scott Morrison, took leave the day before the Albanese government was sworn in. This had been expected given Albanese had indicated he would not want Gaetjens to continue in the role. On 30 May 2022 it was announced that Glyn Davis had been appointed by Albanese to replace Gaetjens.

Judiciary 
On 17 October 2022, Jayne Jagot was sworn in as a Justice of the High Court of Australia, replacing the retiring Justice Patrick Keane. On Jagot's appointment, the High Court of Australia had a majority of female Justices for the first time in its history.

Ambassadorships 
On 30 September 2022, the government announced that it had nominated former Defence Minister Stephen Smith as the next High Commissioner of Australia to the United Kingdom.

On 20 December 2022, the government announced that it had nominated former Prime Minister Kevin Rudd as the next Ambassador of Australia to the United States.

Term of government (2022–present)

Foreign affairs 

Penny Wong was sworn in as Minister for Foreign Affairs on 23 May 2022 as part of the interim Albanese ministry. The new Prime Minister and Minister flew to Tokyo almost immediately after being sworn in to attend a Quadrilateral Security Dialogue meeting with fellow world leaders United States President Joe Biden, Indian Prime Minister Narendra Modi and Japanese Prime Minister Fumio Kishida. At the meeting, Albanese and Wong confirmed that the new government intended to make additional action on climate change a key part of Australia's foreign policy moving forward.

The next day Wong announced that she intended to make her next international trip to Fiji almost immediately after returning to Australia in order to demonstrate the new government's commitment to Australia's relationship with Pacific neighbours.

Days after his election, Albanese spoke with French President Emmanuel Macron and the pair vowed to begin rebuilding a bilateral relationship between Australia and France following the souring of relations under the Morrison government.

On 6 June 2022, Albanese along with Foreign Minister Wong, Trade Minister Don Farrell and Industry Minister Ed Husic visited Indonesian President Joko Widodo in Jakarta to reaffirm relations with Indonesia and ASEAN (Association of Southeast Asian Nations).

On 10 June 2022, Albanese hosted New Zealand Prime Minister Jacinda Ardern on her first official visit to Australia since 2020. The two leaders discussed a range of issues including Australia's controversial Section 501 deportation policy (which had disproportionately affected New Zealanders living in Australia), growing Chinese influence in the Pacific Islands, climate change, and working with Pacific neighbours. On the subject of the 501 deportation policy, Albanese indicated that he would look at addressing New Zealand's concerns about the deportation of its citizens.

On 11 June 2022, Albanese announced that the French defence contractor Naval Group had agreed to settle the previous Morrison government's 2021 cancellation of the 12 Attack-class submarines for a €555 million (AU$830 million) compensation settlement. In response, French Armed Forces Minister Sébastien Lecornu welcomed the settlement and stated that France aims to rebuild its relationship with Australia. In addition, Albanese announced plans to travel to France to reset bilateral relations between Australia and France.

On 12 June 2022, Deputy Prime Minister and Defence Minister Richard Marles held a meeting with Chinese Defence Minister Wei Fenghe at the Shangri-La Dialogue in Singapore. It was the highest level contact between Australia and China in almost three years following a deterioration in Australia-China relations under the previous Morrison government. The two ministers discussed an incident involving the Chinese interception of a Royal Australian Air Force Boeing P-8 Poseidon over the South China Sea and political developments in the Pacific Islands. Earlier, Marles reiterated his government's commitment to pursuing a "productive relationship" with China while advancing its own national interests and regional security within a rules-based system. In response to Chinese concerns that AUKUS was a "mini-NATO", Marles stated that AUKUS was not an alliance similar to NATO but rather focused on the "sharing and development of capabilities" between Australia, the United Kingdom, and United States.

On 14 June 2022, Albanese met with Prime Minister of the Cook Islands Mark Brown. He stated that, the Australian Government is keen to engage with the Pacific and chart a path forward as a partner of choice.

On 15 June 2022, Marles meet with Japanese Defence Minister Kishi Nobuo. Deputy Prime Minister Marles said: 

On 17 June 2022, Wong visited Solomon Islands and met with Prime Minister of Solomon Islands Manasseh Sogavare. She wrote: 

On 27 June 2022, Wong visited Vietnam. In Vietnam, she met President of Vietnam Nguyen Xuan Phuc, Prime Minister of Vietnam Pham Minh Chinh and Foreign Affairs Minister Bùi Thanh Sơn.

On 28 June 2022, Wong visited her birthplace of Malaysia, she met with Minister for Foreign Affairs Dato' Sri Saifuddin bin Abdullah, as well as Defence Minister Dato' Seri Hishammuddin Hussein and Minister for International Trade and Industry, Dato' Seri Azmin Ali.

On 28 June 2022, Albanese visited Madrid for a NATO summit, where he met Prime Minister of Spain Pedro Sánchez. He stated:

On 30 June, Albanese met with French President Macron in Paris to "reset" Australia–France bilateral relations, which had been damaged following the cancellation of a submarine deal by the preceding Morrison government.

On 1 July, Albanese travelled to Ukraine to meet with Ukrainian President Volodymyr Zelenskyy, making him the first Australian Prime Minister to make a diplomatic visit to Ukraine. Albanese pledged a further $100 million in aid to assist with the ongoing Russo-Ukrainian War. In addition, Albanese and the Australian delegation visited Kyiv and Bucha on 4 July, which had seen fighting with Russian forces.

In November 2022, Albanese held a bilateral meeting with Chinese President Xi Jinping bringing an end to the longest diplomatic freeze in 50 years between Australia and China.

In early December 2022, Albanese hosted Finnish Prime Minister Sanna Marin in Sydney; which marked the first state visit by a Finnish head of government to Australia. During the visit, the two leaders discussed several issues including the Australia-European Union trade agreement, human rights, the Russian invasion of Ukraine, and climate change mitigation.

On 7 February 2023, Albanese hosted his New Zealand counterpart Chris Hipkins, who had succeeded Ardern in late January 2023. Besides reaffirming Australian-New Zealand bilateral relations, they also discussed the controversial Section 501 deportation policy. Albanese reiterated that his government would revise the deportation policy to take into account individuals' connections to Australia and the length of time they had lived in the country.

Indigenous affairs 

When declaring victory on election night, Albanese confirmed that his government was committed to implementing the Uluru Statement from the Heart in full within its first term. At Albanese's first press conference as Prime Minister, the podium flags in the blue room at Parliament were changed to include Indigenous and Torres Strait Islander flags in addition to the Australian flag. Upon the opening of the new Parliament, both flags began to be displayed in the House of Representatives and Senate chambers.

Linda Burney was sworn in as Minister for Indigenous Affairs on 1 June 2022. She is the first Indigenous woman to serve in the role.

On 30 July 2022, Albanese attended the Garma Festival of Traditional Cultures where he announced the proposed question the government intends to put to a referendum for the inclusion of an Indigenous Voice to Parliament in the Australian Constitution: "Do you support an alteration to the Constitution that establishes an Aboriginal and Torres Strait Islander Voice?".

In August 2022, Albanese and Burney held a press conference with famed basketballer Shaquille O'Neal, who endorsed the Indigenous Voice to Parliament.

On 3 February 2023, all first ministers signed a statement of intent through the National Cabinet committing to support constitutional recognition of a Voice to Parliament.

Justice

National Anti-Corruption Commission 

During the election campaign, Albanese confirmed that his government would seek to establish a federal National Anti-Corruption Commission within its first year in office.  On the day he was sworn in, Albanese confirmed that he had already ordered work to begin on this task. Attorney-General Mark Dreyfus confirmed that the government intended to introduce legislation to establish an anti-corruption commission by the end of 2022. Dreyfus said that the government's legislation will include provision for the commission to investigate pork-barrelling as well as “serious and systemic” past corruption allegations.

Dreyfus introduced a bill to establish a National Anti-Corruption Commission in September 2022. The bill passed the Parliament on 30 November 2022 in line with the government's commitment to establish an anti-corruption commission prior to the end of 2022.

Bernard Collaery prosecution 
On 7 July 2022, Attorney-General Mark Dreyfus exercised his power under section 71 of the Judiciary Act to cease proceedings against Bernard Collaery in connection with the Australia–East Timor spying scandal.

Immigration 

Clare O'Neil was appointed Minister for Home Affairs.

On 27 May 2022, Jim Chalmers announced that he had, as interim Minister for Home Affairs, exercised his power to allow the Murugappan family to return home to Biloela on bridging visas.

In September 2022, the Albanese government increased the permanent migration intake from 160,000 to a record 195,000 a year.

In late 2022, the Albanese government started repatriation of ISIS brides from Syria. Some Western Sydney locals and mayors criticised the repatriations, as well as the Opposition. The government has not revealed the cost of the repatriations.

On 1 February 2023, Minister for Immigration Andrew Giles confirmed that the Australian Government would preserve the Section 501 deportation policy but issued a ministerial directive for the Department of Home Affairs to consider deportees' length of time in Australia and ties to the community. This directive comes into effect on 3 March 2023. The announcement was welcomed by New Zealand Prime Minister Chris Hipkins. By contrast, deportee advocate Filipa Payne regarded the Australian Government's changes as insufficient, objecting to the mandatory detention policy and the continual deportation of individuals deemed dangerous by the Government.

Industrial relations and employment 

Tony Burke was appointed Minister for Employment. On 23 May 2022, Albanese announced that he would summon an employment summit including unions and business leaders. The summit was expected to be held in September 2022. Albanese flagged a number of changes to industrial relations law including criminalising wage theft.

On 27 May 2022, the Prime Minister sent correspondence to the Fair Work Commission confirming that his government would seek to make a submission to the Commission in support of an increase to the minimum wage. Burke announced that a submission had been formally made to the commission on 3 June 2022 and that a ‘deliberate’ policy of lower wages was not the policy of the new government. The Fair Work Commission subsequently announced on 15 June 2022 that the minimum wage would be raised by 5.2%.

The government passed new workplace harassment laws through the parliament on 28 November 2022. The news laws implement the recommendation of the Respect@Work Report to create a positive duty requiring employers to implement measures to prevent sexual harassment, sex discrimination and victimisation.

On 2 December 2022, the government's Secure Jobs, Better Pay law passed the parliament. Under the new laws, unions can now negotiate multi-employer pay deals in an effort to secure wage increases across particular sectors such as child care and aged care. The law also aims to close the gender pay gap by prohibiting pay secrecy employment clauses and secures the right of workers to seek flexible working arrangements.

Economy 

Jim Chalmers was sworn in as Treasurer of Australia and Katy Gallagher was sworn in as Finance Minister as part of the interim Albanese ministry. Treasurer Chalmers confirmed that the new government would hand down a revised budget in October 2022. In the lead up to the October budget, Chalmers and Gallagher launched an audit to highlight any waste or rorts left behind by the previous government.

Following the election, Albanese confirmed that his government would move forward with the stage three tax cuts which had been promised under the Morrison government. Steven Kennedy has noted that the budget needs to be brought under control and that the tax system needs to be made fit for use.

On 26 June 2022, Treasurer Jim Chalmers warned Australians that inflation will rise significantly.

On 25 October 2022, Chalmers handed down a revised budget – the first under the Albanese government. The budget forecast that inflation would peak at 7.75% at the end of the year.  The budget also took steps to fund the government's election promises largely by using funding earmarked by the former government which had not yet been spent.

On 28 February 2023,  the government announced that it would seek to cut tax concessions on superannuation accounts with more than $3m. It intends to legislate this term for a change to take effect in 2025.

Parliamentary affairs 
Tony Burke was appointed Leader of the House in the Albanese ministry. Prior to being sworn in, Burke said that he was determined to ‘fix’ parliamentary procedures and noted that the situation had become farcical during the previous parliament. Burke confirmed in the first week of the Albanese government that he had already begun discussions to this end with the incoming crossbench including Independent MP Helen Haines.

On 24 June 2022, Prime Minister Anthony Albanese decided to cut crossbench advisory staff from 4 to the pre-Coalition level of 1. This decision worsened the government's relations with crucial crossbenchers in the Senate, and will potentially make passing legislation in the Senate harder. Many crossbench MPs and senators later had their staff allocations increased after making direct appeals to Albanese.

On 7 July 2022, Albanese unveiled a new ministerial code of conduct which prohibited ministers from utilising blind trusts. This was in response to the blind trust used by Christian Porter under the previous government to fund personal defamation proceedings brought by him.

On 26 August 2022, Albanese and Attorney-General Mark Dreyfus announced that the government had appointed former High Court Justice Virginia Bell to lead an inquiry into the appointment of former Prime Minister, the Hon Scott Morrison MP, to administer departments other than the Department of Prime Minister and Cabinet and related matters". Bell found that Morrison's appointments were corrosive of public trust in government and recommended the implementation of legislation requiring the public announcement of ministerial appointments. Albanese confirmed that he would recommend that his cabinet implement all of Bell's recommendations in this regard and Burke successfully moved a motion in the House censuring Morrison on 30 November 2022, making him the first former prime minister to be censured.

Republic 

Matt Thistlethwaite was appointed the first Assistant Minister for the Republic on 1 June 2022.

Thistlethwaite confirmed that the government's priority during its first term would be to seek constitutional recognition of Indigenous Australians, but that a transition to a republic could be on the agenda for a potential second term. Following the death of Queen Elizabeth II on 8 September 2022, Albanese reiterated that his government would not pursue becoming a republic during their first parliamentary term.

Energy 

Chris Bowen was appointed Minister for Energy in the Albanese ministry. Shortly after the Albanese government came to office, Australia entered into an energy crisis marked by significantly increased power prices. Bowen convened a meeting with his state and territory counterparts on 8 June 2022. While it was agreed that there was no short-term solution to the current crisis, a plan was put in place to ensure the market is in a better position in the future. At the meeting, the ministers agreed to expedite work on a capacity mechanism which will require the energy regulator to pay retailers to maintain excess capacity. The ministers have also agreed to work on a national energy transition plan ahead of their next meeting in July 2022.

On 9 December 2022, Albanese announced that National Cabinet had agreed to a plan put forward by the government to deal with rising energy prices by introducing gas and energy price caps. Albanese also announced that he would recall the parliament to deal with the energy intervention bill before the end of the year.The bill passed the parliament on 15 December 2022. It introduced a 12-month cap on energy prices and a $1.5 billion relief package for households and businesses.

Climate change 
On 16 June 2022, Bowen and Albanese submitted a new Nationally Determined Contribution to the United Nations which formally committed Australia to reducing carbon emissions by 43% on 2005 levels. This represented an increase from the 26 to 28% target under the previous government. These targets were also codified in legislation which the government passed with support from the Greens and crossbench senators.

Education 

Jason Clare was appointed Minister for Education. On 17 June 2022, Clare confirmed that the Albanese government intends to make changes which give schools a choice of whether to hire a religious or secular pastoral care worker through the National School Chaplaincy Programme.

Clare announced an Australian Universities Accord with the terms of reference covering funding, affordability, employment conditions for staff and how universities and TAFEs can work together. The Accord's final report is due to be handed down in December 2023.

Environment 

Tanya Plibersek was appointed Minister for the Environment and Water.

Plibersek attended the UN ocean conference in Lisbon on 26 June 2022 where she announced five new blue carbon projects which are understood to include assistance for developing nations to safeguard the health of their oceans.

On 19 July 2022, Plibersek released the State of the Environment Report which had been handed to the previous government in December 2021. The Report provided that every category of the Australian environment – apart from urban environments – was now in a poor and deteriorating state. In response, Plibersek announced that the government would adopt a new target of protecting 30% of the Australian environment and promised stronger environmental protection legislation to be introduced in 2023.

On 8 December 2022, Plibersek announced that the government would commit to a reform of federal environmental laws, in response to an independent review first submitted to the Morrison Government in 2020. The reform would include the creation of a federal Environment Protection Agency (EPA) which would impose legally binding environmental standards and oversee decision-making processes of the states and territories, as well as increased restrictions to native logging and the establishment of a "traffic light" rating system where some areas could be designated as having a high conservation value. The government planned to introduce legislation to parliament before the end of 2023.

Housing 

Julie Collins was appointed Minister for Housing. The government's Regional First Home Buyer Guarantee was launched on 1 October 2022. The program provides a government guarantee of up to 15 per cent for eligible first home buyers, so regional Australians with a deposit of as little as 5 per cent can avoid paying lenders’ mortgage insurance.

Welfare 
The Albanese government announced that existing mutual obligation penalties would be wiped clean from people's records as the government transitioned to the Workforce Australia system for JobSeeker, saying that it was "too late" to scrap the system.  A review of the Workforce Australia JobSeeker scheme will be tabled in parliament in September 2023.

Legislation to end the Cashless Debit Card was passed by the House of Representatives, and will be considered by the Senate in September.  Cashless Debit Card users in the Northern Territory will be transitioned back onto the BasicsCard, a Howard-era income management scheme, despite Labor promising prior to the election to end compulsory income management.

A Royal Commission into the Robodebt Scheme was announced by Albanese with Letters Patent issued on 25 August 2022. The Royal Commission will be chaired by former Queensland Supreme Court Justice Catherine Holmes and is expected to conclude on 18 April 2023.

Territory rights 
Kristy McBain was appointed Minister for the Territories. She confirmed that the government would seek to introduce a bill likely in the first week of the new parliament to give the Australian territories the right to set their own voluntary assisted dying laws. However, she noted that the government had no plans to expand the number of senators representing the Australian Capital Territory despite its rapidly expanding population.

The government's bill to empower the territories to make laws relating to voluntary assisted dying passed the parliament on 1 December 2022.

Health 
Mark Butler was appointed Health Minister.

Pharmaceutical Benefits Scheme 
In October 2022, the government's cheaper medications bill passed the parliament. The new law reduced the cost of PBS medications by 29% and reduced the co-payment.

COVID-19 pandemic 
On 30 June 2022, Butler ordered an inquiry into Australia's COVID-19 vaccine supplies, future variant jabs and how the rollout was caught short at the height of the pandemic. The review will also examine the deals struck by the former government to purchase vaccines and therapeutic treatments.

Pandemic leave payments and access to free rapid antigen tests for concession card holders expired on 1 July 2022. The new government initially did not take steps to extend these programs, but reinstated them on 16 July 2022.

On 3 July 2022, Butler announced that from 12:01am on 6 July 2022 changes to the Biosecurity Act will come into effect which provide that persons seeking to visit Australia will no longer have to declare their COVID-19 vaccination status.

On 7 July 2022, Butler confirmed that persons aged over 30 would be eligible to receive a fourth COVID-19 vaccine dose from 11 July 2022.

The government altered rules governing isolation periods so that persons infected with the virus only need isolate for 5 days from 9 September 2022. Albanese announced on 30 September that a mandatory isolation period would no longer apply at all for persons infected with COVID-19.

2022 floods response 
Following the 2022 New South Wales floods, the government announced one-off, non means tested disaster relief payments to persons living in 29 local government areas impacted by the disaster.

On 12 July 2022, Albanese announced a further $80 million to assist with clean up efforts as well as grants for farmers, small businesses, not-for-profit organisations and local councils. Albanese also announced $36 million for a program to assess buildings and flooded properties including free demolition of those found to be unlivable.

Following the 2022 south eastern Australia floods, the federal government made a one-off, non-means tested disaster recovery payment of $1,000 per eligible adult and $400 per eligible child available.  Across the states suffering in the crisis, 23 local government areas were made eligible.

Aged care 
The first bill to pass the new parliament was one responding to the 17 recommendations of the Aged Care Royal Commission. The legislation amends the aged care funding model and introduces new reporting and transparency requirements.

The government also introduced a bill in the first sitting of the new parliament seeking to implement it's election commitment to ensure that there is a nurse in nursing homes at all times. This bill was passed by the parliament on 27 October 2022.

The government entered submissions to the Fair Work Commission supporting the case for a wage increase in the aged care industry and committed to funding any such increase. The Commission ordered a 15% increase and the government is expected to enter submissions related to the timing and implementation of this.

The government otherwise announced that further aged care reforms would be introduced in 2023.

NDIS 
Providers in the National Disability Insurance Scheme are being scrutinised for fraud, and a multiagency task force will be formed to look into this issue.

Child care 
In November 2022, the parliament passed the government's cheaper childcare laws. The new laws will commence operation in July 2023 and will see the childcare subsidy increased from 85% to 90% for families on an income below $80,000.

Administrative Appeals Tribunal 
On 16 December 2022, the Labor Albanese government announced that it will abolish the Administrative Appeals Tribunal AAT and replace it with a new body.

Australia Day 
On 18 January 2023, the Labor Albanese government removed a Morrison government ban on public servants working 26 January, Australia Day. The Liberal opposition criticised the move. 

On 16 December 2022, the Labor Albanese government removed a Morrison government policy of making local councils to hold citizenship ceremonies on 26 January,Australia Day.

See also 

 Albanese ministry
 47th Parliament of Australia
 2020s in Australia political history

Notes

References 

 
2020s in Australian politics
Governments of Australia
Anthony Albanese